The 1972 South Carolina United States Senate election was held on November 7, 1972 to select the U.S. Senator from the state of South Carolina.  Popular incumbent Republican Senator Strom Thurmond easily defeated Democratic challenger Eugene N. Zeigler.

Democratic primary
The South Carolina Democratic Party held their primary for governor on August 29, 1972.  Eugene N. Zeigler, a state senator from Florence, defeated John Bolt Culbertson to become the Democratic nominee in the general election.

Republican primary
Senator Strom Thurmond faced no opposition from South Carolina Republicans and avoided a primary election.

General election campaign
The general election campaign was a lackluster affair as Thurmond was heavily favored to win re-election and he outspent Zeigler by a margin of four to one.  However, Thurmond's re-election was almost derailed when his hometown newspaper, the Edgefield Advertiser, ran the headline "SEN. THURMOND IS UNPRINCIPLED WITH COLORED OFFSPRING WHILE PARADING AS A DEVOUT SEGREGATIONIST" on the October 11 front page.  The Thurmond campaign fiercely denied that he had sired a black child and claimed that it was a dirty trick being played by the Zeigler campaign.  While the allegation ultimately proved true, at the time it served to galvanize voters for Thurmond.

Election results

 
 

|-
| 
| colspan=5 |Republican hold
|-

See also
List of United States senators from South Carolina
United States Senate elections, 1972

References

South Carolina
1972
1972 South Carolina elections
Strom Thurmond